Thomasia tenuivestita is a species of flowering plant in the family Malvaceae and is endemic to the south-west of Western Australia. It is a shrub with its new growth covered with greyish, star-shaped hairs, and has egg-shaped leaves, and racemes of mauve flowers.

Description
There are 2 leaf-like stipules at the base of each petiole. Both surfaces of the leaves are covered with star-shaped hairs and the edges of the leaves have irregular teeth. Flowering occurs from July to October.

Taxonomy and naming
Thomasia tenuivestita was first formally described in 1860 by Ferdinand von Mueller in his Fragmenta Phytographiae Australiae. The specific epithet (tenuivestita) means "thinly-covered".

Distribution and habitat
This thomasia grows in woodland and heath, often between granite boulders or in swampy places, in scattered populations near Coorow, Badgingarra, Wongan Hills, Hyden and York in the Avon Wheatbelt, Geraldton Sandplains, Jarrah Forest and Mallee bioregions of south-western Western Australia.

Conservation status
Thomasia tenuivestita is listed as "Priority Three" by the Government of Western Australia Department of Biodiversity, Conservation and Attractions, meaning that it is poorly known and known from only a few locations but is not under imminent threat.

References

tenuivestita
Rosids of Western Australia
Taxa named by Ferdinand von Mueller
Plants described in 1860